Siosifa is a Tongan masculine given name. It may refer to:

Siosifa Lisala (born 1994), Tongan-born Japanese rugby union player
Siosifa Talakai (born 1997), Australian rugby league player
Siosifa Tuʻitupou Tuʻutafaiva, Tongan lawyer and politician

Masculine given names